Tithing buildings of The Church of Jesus Christ of Latter-day Saints are storehouses related to tithing by members of the Church of Jesus Christ of Latter-day Saints.

These are places where Mormons delivered tithes, often in form of agricultural products.  

There were at least 28 in Utah and at least one in Idaho, which functioned between 1850 and 1910 or so.  These facilities served for church members to be able to collect, store, and distribute the farm products donated as tithing, for at the time, agricultural products comprised most of what many people worked for and earned. Serving as nodes for economic activity and welfare, some of these were vital buildings for many of the early inhabitants of Utah who were members of the LDS church.

A number of these survive and are significant as historic sites listed on the U.S. National Register of Historic Places (NRHP).

Some are termed granaries.

These include:

in Utah
Clarkston Tithing Granary (1905), Clarkston, Utah, NRHP-listed
Farmington Tithing Office (1907-1909), Farmington, Utah, NRHP-listed
Fairview Tithing Office/Bishop's Storehouse, Fairview, Utah, NRHP-listed
Huntington Tithing Granary, Huntington, Utah, NRHP-listed
Hyrum Stake Tithing Office, Hyrum, Utah, NRHP-listed
Kanosh Tithing Office, Kanosh, Utah, NRHP-listed
Lakeview Tithing Office (1899), Provo, Utah, NRHP-listed  Built originally as a creamery, it was acquired by the local LDS church to serve as a tithing office in 1904 or after.
Leeds Tithing Office, Leeds, Utah, NRHP-listed
Lehi Ward Tithing Barn-Centennial Hall, Lehi, Utah, NRHP-listed
Lewiston Tithing Office and Granary, Lewiston, Utah, NRHP-listed
Loa Tithing Office, Loa, Utah, NRHP-listed
Meadow Tithing Granary, Meadow, Utah, NRHP-listed
Paradise Tithing Office, Paradise, Utah, NRHP-listed
Pine Valley Chapel and Tithing Office, Pine Valley, Washington County, Utah, NRHP-listed
Pleasant Grove Tithing Office, Pleasant Grove, Utah, NRHP-listed
Sandy Tithing Office, Sandy, Utah, NRHP-listed
Santa Clara Tithing Company, Santa Clara, Utah, NRHP-listed
Smithfield Tithing Office, Smithfield, Utah, NRHP-listed
Richmond Tithing Office, Richmond, Utah, NRHP-listed
Teasdale Tithing Granary, Teasdale, Utah, NRHP-listed
Vernal Tithing Office, Vernal, Utah, NRHP-listed

Elsewhere
Old LDS Tithing/Paris Post Building, Paris, Idaho, NRHP-listed

See also
Tithe barn, common in Northern Europe

References

 
History of the Church of Jesus Christ of Latter-day Saints
Buildings